Víctor Manuel Montiel Comparán (born 21 February 1971) is a Mexican football manager and former player.

References

External links

1971 births
Living people
Mexican footballers
Association football defenders
Atlas F.C. footballers
Footballers from Guadalajara, Jalisco